Sklar  (also Sklyar), is a Ukrainian and Belorussian surname meaning "glassmaker", and may refer to:

 Abe Sklar, American mathematician
 Jessica Sklar, American mathematician, daughter of Lawrence
 Jessica Seinfeld, formerly Sklar, American author and philanthropist
 Lawrence Sklar (born 1938), American philosopher, father of Jessica
 Leland Sklar (born 1947), American musician
 Marty Sklar (born 1934), Walt Disney Company executive
 Matthew Sklar (born 1973), Broadway composer
 Michael Sklar, American actor
 Pamela Sklar (born 1959), American psychiatrist and neuroscientist
 Rachel Sklar, Canadian lawyer and media blogger
 Rick Sklar (1930–1992), American radio program director
 Robert Sklar (1936–2011), historian
 the Sklar Brothers (Randy and Jason), American identical twin comedians and actors

Sklyar 
 Oleksandr Sklyar, Ukrainian footballer
 Alexandr Sklyar, Kazakhstani swimmer
 Igor Sklyar, Russian actor and singer
 Roman Sklyar, Kazakhstani politician

See also 
 Shklar (disambiguation)

Jewish surnames